The Museum of Industry is part of the Historic Pensacola Village complex in the Pensacola Historic District. It describes in detail the main industries of early Pensacola: fishing/ice, clay/brickmaking, lumber, and transportation.

The Building
Built in 1884 for the Pensacola Ice Company, the "Hispanic Building" was a long narrow brick structure with six arches facing Zaragoza Street. Earlier structures at this site served as British and Spanish barracks, a boarding house and, in the 1830s the home of the West Florida Academy. The present building has housed the New Orleans Grocery Company, the Levy-Hallmark Company and the Pensacola-Lurton Company, which leased it to the county for a surplus warehouse. It was acquired by the city in 1968 and is now an integral part of the Historic Pensacola Village.

Early Pensacola Industries
This is a summary of the museum contents.

Timber
Pensacola was a thickly wooded area, and the trees provided with lumber and lumber products (e.g., turpentine). Much of the equipment involved in processing timber is displayed on the west end of the building.

Brickmaking
Pensacola residents produced an amazing number of bricks. Many bricks from Pensacola can be found in the several forts in the area. The museum has a portion of a kiln in the southeast corner.

Fishing
Fish were plentiful in early Pensacola, and the Museum of Industry houses an old boat from that era.

Railroad
Pensacola's deepwater port was excellent for transporting goods from sea to land. There is a port downtown to this day, although it is nowhere as busy as it was then.

References

External links
Historic Pensacola Village's Official Website

Historic Pensacola Village
Museums in Pensacola, Florida
Industry museums in Florida
Commercial buildings completed in 1884